Wandering may refer to:

 Wandering (dementia)
 Wandering, a 2021 EP by JO1
 Wandering, Western Australia, a town located in the Wheatbelt region of Western Australia
 Shire of Wandering, a local government area in the Wheatbelt region of Western Australia

See also
 
 
 Wander (disambiguation)
 Wanderer (disambiguation)
 Jitter
 Joyride (crime)
 Meander (disambiguation)
 Vagabond (disambiguation)
 Vagrant (disambiguation)